Taussig–Bing syndrome is a cyanotic congenital heart defect  in which the patient has both double outlet right ventricle (DORV) and subpulmonic ventricular septal defect (VSD).

In DORV, instead of the normal situation where blood from the left ventricle (LV) flows out to the aorta and blood from the right ventricle (RV) flows out to the pulmonary artery, both aorta and pulmonary artery are connected to the RV, and the only path for blood from the LV is across the VSD.  When the VSD is subpulmonic (sitting just below the pulmonary artery), the LV blood then flows preferentially to the pulmonary artery.  Then the RV blood, by default, flows mainly to the aorta.

The clinical manifestations of a Taussig-Bing anomaly, therefore, are much like those of dextro-Transposition of the great arteries (but the surgical repair is different). It can be corrected surgically also with the arterial switch operation (ASO).

It is managed with Rastelli procedure. It is named after Helen B. Taussig and Richard Bing, who first described it in 1949.

References

External links

Congenital heart defects
Syndromes affecting the heart